is a Japanese manga written and illustrated by Miyuki Kitagawa. It was serialized in Shōjo Comic.

Manga
Shogakukan published the manga's 13 bound volumes between 25 March 1996 and 22 July 1999. Shogakukan re-released the manga in 6 bunkobons between 26 June 2002 and 26 November 2002.

The series is licensed in Spain by Editorial Ivrea.

Live-action drama

The manga was adapted into a 17 episode Taiwanese drama titled starring Ariel Lin, Wu Chun of Fahrenheit and Simon Yam. It was produced by Comic Productions (可米製作股份有限公司) and directed by Mingtai Wang (王明台). It was broadcast on cable TV Gala Television (GTV) Variety Show/CH 28 (八大綜合台) on 6 June 2006 to 23 September 2006.

References

External links

1999 comics endings
Manga adapted into television series
Shōjo manga
Romance anime and manga
Shogakukan manga